Hecht-Lancaster & Buzzell Music, Inc. (sometimes referred to as Hecht-Lancaster-Buzzell Music Publishing, and later known as Hecht & Buzzell Music, Inc. and Colby Music, Inc.) was an American music publishing company founded by film producer Harold Hecht, his brother-in-law Loring Buzzell, and Hecht's business partner, actor/producer Burt Lancaster. Hecht-Lancaster & Buzzell Music was solely associated with the American Society of Composers, Authors and Publishers (ASCAP). The three partners also founded the music publishing company Calyork Music, Inc. (sometimes referred to as Calyork Music Corporation or Calyork Music Publishing), which was solely associated with Broadcast Music, Inc. (BMI). Hecht, Lancaster and Buzzell also briefly operated their own record label, Calyork Records, which was active in the late 1950s. Hecht-Lancaster & Buzzell Music, Calyork Music and Calyork Records were divisions of Hecht and Lancaster's film production corporation Norma Productions.

Compositions published by Hecht-Lancaster & Buzzell Music and Calyork Music have been recorded by dozens of artists and have in turn been released by such record labels as Columbia Records, Warner Bros. Records, MGM Records, ABC-Paramount Records, Capitol Records, London Records, United Artists Records, Decca Records, Mercury Records, RCA Victor Records, Jubilee Records, Coral Records, Top Rank Records, Date Records, Kapp Records, Apollo Records, Everest Records and Cabot Records; as well as their own imprints Calyork Records and Maine Records.

Origin, Cromwell Music association and Leigh Music

Following World War II, Hollywood's Golden Age started to fade. After a 1948 ruling that major studios could no longer own theater houses and thereby monopolize production, distribution and exhibition, things changed greatly. More room was awarded to independent producers, and fewer relied on long-term deals with major studios. Talent agent Harold Hecht and actor Burt Lancaster formed Norma Productions, a film production company, in the summer of 1947. But income in the movie business box office, although far from poor, continued to dwindle, because of stiff competition from radio and television. By the mid-1950s most households owned a television, and the producers who could afford it started producing shows for that market. A similar situation was happening in the music business, as most households owned at least one phonograph. All the major studios either bought out existing record labels or started their own. The studios also began exploiting the soundtrack album, which had before then mostly been an M-G-M musical fad but caught on with all types of films in the mid-1950s.

In January 1955 Hecht-Lancaster Productions, by then the leading independent film production unit in Hollywood, announced that it was extending its operations into music publishing, entering into a partnership with Howie Richmond's Cromwell Music, Inc. company. The contacts were made through Loring Bruce Buzzell, Hecht's brother-in-law (the brother of his first wife, Gloria Joyce Buzzell), who worked for Richmond at Cromwell Music. Loring and Gloria's father, Samuel Jesse Buzzell, had been a music patent attorney, and their uncle, Edward Buzzell, was a successful film director. Both Hecht and Buzzell had worked for Irving Mills' Mills Music, Inc. company earlier in their careers. Buzzell was also a field man for the American Society of Composers, Authors and Publishers (ASCAP) and in July 1954 married singer Lu Ann Simms (née Lu Ann Ciminelli), who got her big break performing on the Arthur Godfrey show and had since then released a series of successful singles through Columbia Records.

Hecht-Lancaster Productions first published the music from their film Marty in April and June 1955 through Cromwell Music. This gave way for a series of interpretations by various artists of Marty'''s theme song.. Billboard, May 21, 1955. p. 52."Reviews of New Pop Records", Billboard, June 4 1955, p36 Hecht-Lancaster Productions' next film soundtrack, The Kentuckian, composed by Bernard Herrmann, was published through Frank Loesser's publishing company, Frank Music, Inc. It is unknown what kind of deal Hecht and Lancaster worked out with Frank Loesser, or if Hermann had a publishing deal directly with Loesser.

In June 1956, it was announced that Hecht, Lancaster and Buzzell had formed their own music publishing company, Leigh Music, Inc., which would be co-publishing music from their 1956 film Trapeze with Cromwell Music. The name of the company was based on Buzzell's daughter Cynthia Leigh Buzzell. On July 6, 1956, the title song, Trapeze, was co-published through Cromwell Music and Leigh Music. By the second song co-published, Lola's Theme, on August 24, 1956, Leigh Music had been renamed Hecht-Lancaster & Buzzell Music, Inc.Calatog of Copyright Entries, Music, 1956 The new company was listed under the same address as Cromwell Music: 151 West 46th Street, New York City. Lola's Theme also received various interpretations and singles."Special Release", Billboard, July 14 1956, p32

In mid-July 1956, the Hollywood-based Record Releasing Corporation approached Hecht-Lancaster Productions regarding a music a deal, though no information surfaced as to future plans.  

Hecht-Lancaster & Buzzell Music and Calyork Music publishing companies
The new company remained silent for the next six months, until a press announcement was made in March 1957. By then, Hecht-Lancaster Productions had made James Hill a full partner in the company and changed its name to Hecht-Hill-Lancaster Productions, which was a subsidiary of Norma Productions, but Hill was not included in the music venture. The announcement revealed that Harold Hecht, Loring Buzzell and Burt Lancaster had formed a publishing company with plans to publish the scores of Hecht-Hill-Lancaster Productions films and non-film-related pop music. 

Two separate publishing firms were announced in the March 1957 press release. Hecht-Lancaster & Buzzell Music, Inc. was to be solely associated with ASCAP, while Calyork Music, Inc. was to work exclusively with BMI (Calyork Music's CAE/IPI number is 4901911). The name Calyork was a combination of California, where Hecht and Lancaster were based, and New York, where Buzzell was based and where Hecht and Lancaster were originally from. The partners intended to alter between the companies for each release, starting with the soundtrack to Hecht-Hill-Lancaster Productions' The Bachelor Party through Hecht-Lancaster & Buzzell, and then the soundtrack to Sweet Smell of Success through Calyork. Both Hecht-Lancaster & Buzzell Music and Calyork Music were under the umbrella of Norma Productions.

In the summer of 1957, Howie Richmond announced that he was interested in acquiring overseas distribution of the Hecht-Lancaster & Buzzell soundtracks.

Notable releases and success
The soundtrack to Hecht-Lancaster Productions' film Trapeze was released by Columbia Records in June 1956 (catalog CL 870), to a degree of success."Columbia Best-Selling Records", Billboard, June 23 1956, p44 But it was the film's and soundtrack LP's theme song, Lola's Theme, that became a radio favorite. It spanned three successful singles interpreted by different bands; in June 1956 Columbia Records released a Muir Mathieson Orchestra version featuring Lola's Theme on the A-side and Mike and Lola's Love Theme on the B-side (catalog Columbia 40725). This was followed in July by a Coral Records release of Steve Allen's version featuring Lola's Theme on the A-side and Conversation (on the Telephone) on the B-side (catalog Coral 61681). Later that same month, a third single was released by Mercury Records of Ralph Marterie and His Orchestra's version featuring Lola's Theme on the A-side and Yes Sir, That's My Baby on the B-side (catalog Mercury 70197).

Hecht-Lancaster & Buzzell Music and Calyork Music went on to publish songs for every future Norma Productions (and its subsidiary companies) films. Their films include The Bachelor Party and Sweet Smell of Success in 1957, Run Silent, Run Deep and Separate Tables (which was nominated for an Academy Award for Best Music, Scoring of a Dramatic or Comedy Picture) in 1958, Cry Tough, The Rabbit Trap, Take a Giant Step and Summer of the Seventeenth Doll in 1959 and finally, The Unforgiven in 1960.

It is now practically impossible to know all of the various interpretations of songs copyrighted and published by Hecht-Lancaster & Buzzell Music and Calyork Music, as some may only have been performed live with no documentation, others may have been recorded but not released, while others may have been recorded and released but did not chart. However, most of the movie soundtracks have been well discussed, even in negative criticism. The company's first official single, the theme song from The Bachelor Party, was composed and performed by Alex North but was not successful. Theme Song from The Bachelor Party appeared on the B-side of an RCA Victor Records 7" showcasing Alex North's theme for Playhouse 90 on the A-side (catalog Victor 6896).

The company's second offering, which featured music from Sweet Smell of Success, was extremely well received and was also of significant importance in the soundtrack category. Sweet Smell of Success marked the first time that a film had two different soundtracks, each featuring completely different music."Decca Debuts Double Feature". Billboard, July 1, 1957. p. 25. Thus, Sweet Smell of Success spanned two soundtrack LPs and two promotional singles. The first soundtrack LP was released in July 1957 by Decca Records (catalog DL 8610) and featured the jazz score composed by Elmer Bernstein. That same month, the lead single was released by Decca Records with the songs The Street and Toots Shor's Blues (catalog Decca 30379). The second soundtrack LP featured music composed and performed by the Chico Hamilton Quintet, who also appeared in the film. Decca Records released this LP in August 1957 (catalog DL 8614) and promoted it with a single by Mark Murphy featuring Goodbye Baby on the A-side and The Right Kind of Woman on the B-side (catalog Decca 30390)."Pop Records Reviews". Billboard, July 22, 1957. p. 72.

In October 1958 the Clifton Productions film (a subsidiary of Norma Productions) Separate Tables yielded three singles of its theme song. The first was performed by Vic Damone, released by Columbia Records (catalog Columbia 41287); the second was by Eydie Gormé, released by ABC-Paramount Records (catalog ABC 9971); and the third was by Lu Ann Simms, released by Jubilee Records (catalog Jubilee 1092)."Music as Written". Billboard, October 27, 1958. p. 13. The Columbia Records single became Damone's best-selling record.

Hecht-Lancaster & Buzzell Music's most significant song was May You Always, composed by Dick Charles and Larry Markes in the fall of 1958. It was first recorded by the McGuire Sisters, who were friends of Lu Ann Simms and had worked with her on the Arthur Godfrey show and attended Simms and Buzzell's wedding. The version recorded by the McGuire Sisters, released by Coral Records (catalog Coral 62059), peaked at number 11 on Billboard's Hot 100 chart on January 26, 1959, and became the best-selling record of 1959; the song also became the second-best-selling sheet music in the United States and a top ten in Britain."Hot 100". Billboard, January 26, 1959. p. 40. Other artists who have recorded the song include Vince Hill and Ken Dodd, both for EMI, The Kays for Gala Records, Barbara Cook for DRG Records, John Warren, Joe "Mr Piano" Henderson and The Jean-Ettes, all for Pye Records, Maureen Evans for Embassy Records, Carol Williams for Melcot Music, Anita Bryant for Columbia Records, Tammy Jones and Bobby Vinton, both for Epic Records, Page Morton for M-G-M Records, Dave Garroway and Sandy Stewart for Dick Charles Recording, Harry Harrison for Amy Records, The Gatlin Brother for Branson Entertainment, Eddy Arnold for RCA-Victor Records, Ian McNabb for This Way Up, The Mills Brothers for Dot Records, Johnny Gilbert for Janel Records, Deep River Boys for Fontana Records, Jack Scott for Jade Records, and Dorothy Squires for Esban Records.

The theme song from The Unforgiven, titled "The Unforgiven – The Need for Love", was composed by Dimitri Tiomkin with lyrics by Ned Washington and was very successful with many recordings by popular artists in the early 1960s. It was recorded by Don Costa, Tito Rodríguez and Roy Liberto, all three for United Artists Records, The McGuire Sisters for Coral Records, Clyde Otis for Mercury Records, Ronnie Hilton and Gloria Lasso, both for HMV Records, The Wally Stott Orchestra And Chorus for Pye Records, Ron Goodwin and His Orchestra for Parlophone Records, Jackie Gleason for Capitol Records, Earl Bostic and Leon Pops Orchestra, both for King Records, Franck Pourcel for Pathé, Robert Jeantal and Michel Clement, both for Philips Records, François Deguelt, Max Jaffa and Norrie Paramor, both for Columbia Records, Helmut Zacharias for Polydor Records, The Clebanoff Strings for Mercury Records, Petula Clark for Disques Vogue, Frank Chacksfield for Ace of Clubs Records, Lew Douglas for Carlton Records, The Medallion Strings for Medallion Records, Jesse Crawford for Decca Records, and Gino Mescoli for Vesuvius Records.

Hecht-Lancaster & Buzzell Music also had fruitful collaboration with songwriters Kenny Jacobson and Rhoda Roberts, from whom they published and copyrighted over thirty songs. Some of these included "Just for Two" and "Somebody Loses, Somebody Wins", both recorded by Jaye P. Morgan for M-G-M Records,"Review of This Weeks Singles". Billboard, July 20, 1959. p. 31. "Run, Don't Walk", "The Mooch" and "Bye Um Bye", all three recorded by Lu Ann Simms for Columbia Records and Jubilee Records, "Baby, Je Vous Aime", "Crazy Dreamer", "That's All That Matters" and "The Wonder of It All", all four recorded by Bobby Miller for Jubilee Records and Apollo Records,"Reviews of New Pop Records". Billboard, February 8, 1960. p. 43. "Midnight Blue" and "This Could Be the Night", both recorded by Herb Corey for Top Rank Records, "Easy Does It", recorded by Johnny Mathis for Columbia Records, "I'll Be Waitin'", recorded by Kenny Rankin for Decca Records, "Didja Mean Whatcha Said?", recorded by Steve Karmen for Mercury Records, "Made for Each Other", recorded by Don Rondo for Jubilee Records, "Lovable", recorded by Jill Corey for Columbia Records, "Have Another", recorded by Lou Monte for RCA-Victor Records, "Bye Um Bye" recorded by Margaret Imlau for Decca Records, "This Could be the Night", recorded by The Arena Twins for Kapp Records, and "Cafe of Blue Mirrors" and "Ragamuffin's Holiday", both recorded by Ken Colby for Maine Records.

Calyork Records and Maine Records
Little documentation has been found about Calyork Records and Maine Records, two record labels that Hecht, Lancaster and Buzzell operated together. Most independent record labels of the era pressed records in extremely limited quantities and were only sent to radio disk jockeys and magazine representatives, in the hope of creating enough buzz to secure a major record label re-release for the outing. In most cases, the independent record labels of the era used their releases as portfolios or demos to shop to the major record labels. As such, few copies of Calyork Records or Maine Records releases have survived.

The only known release by Calyork Records is from 1958; the two songs featured on the disk were published on April 15, 1958. The 45 RPM 7" vinyl credits Calyork Records with the two songs published to Calyork Music as a Lou Bartel Production (songwriter and producer). It features the songs Anxiously Waiting and She Flipped Me performed by doo wop band The Flipteens. The record also indicates that it is a "Promotion Record" and a "Sample Copy Not For Sale". The address of the record label listed 729 7th Avenue, New York City as its headquarters, which was where the Hecht-Lancaster & Buzzell Music offices were then located, having moved out of Howard S. Richmond's office at 151 West 46th Street in New York City. The record was manufactured by United Artists Records, which had a pressing plant in the same building as the Hecht-Lancaster & Buzzell companies.

The only known release by Maine Records, also known as Maine Record Company, is from 1959. Maine Records was named after the State of Maine, where Buzzell had gone to university (he also named another company, Colby Music, after his alma mater). In March 1959, Maine Records released a 45 RPM 7" vinyl by Ken Colby featuring the songs Cafe of Blue Mirrors and Ragamuffin's Holiday, two songs already published by Hecht-Lancaster & Buzzell Music. The record was manufactured and distributed by Jubilee Records.

 Colby Music and overseas licensing 
Buzzell, Hecht and Lancaster initially had to work out a licensing deal for their published songs to be legally available outside the United States and collect royalties for their songwriters. Buzzell worked out a tie-up deal with Howard S. Richmond's British-based subsidiary Essex Music, Ltd. Records and sheet music released in the United Kingdom were listed as from Essex Music, Ltd. Ultimately, Hecht, Lancaster and Buzzell founded their own British imprint, Colby Music, Ltd. The name of the company came from Buzzell's alma mater Colby University. Colby Music was also extended to several other European countries, which were each represented by local firms. In Germany, Colby Music was represented by Julian Aberbach, while in Sweden the Scandinavian rights were licensed to Multitone Musikförlag by its New York representative Claes Dahlgren.

Demise
Calyork Music's final known registry is listed on September 23, 1958, with three Steve Karmen songs. Although the copyrights and royalty collections remained active, no new works were published under that company, with Hecht-Lancaster & Buzzell Music taking on all new publishing. The Hecht and Lancaster Companies started having interpersonal issues in early 1959, resulting in an announced hiatus from the film business in April 1959. In July 1959 Harold Hecht and Gloria Buzzell separated. This may have caused friction between Hecht and the Buzzell family. Both of these factors played against Hecht-Lancaster & Buzzell Music.

On October 20, 1959, Loring Buzzell suffered a fatal heart attack. Following this, few additional songs were published by Hecht-Lancaster & Buzzell Music. The exceptions include the theme songs for the Hecht-Hill-Lancaster Productions film Summer of the Seventeenth Doll and four songs co-written by widowed Lu Ann Simms and family friend Jaye P. Morgan. The final material published by the firm was Dimitri Tiomkin's soundtrack of the Hecht-Hill-Lancaster Productions film The Unforgiven'', which was filled under the modified company name Hecht & Buzzell Music, Inc., as the film production company had dissolved by then and the three partners had gone their separate ways. Hecht & Buzzell Music was managed by Harold Hecht and Lu Ann Simms. 

Simms took over the publishing companies following her husband's death and continued after Hecht's exit. By 1961, Calyork Music and Hecht & Buzzell Music's addresses were listed as 119 West 57th Street, New York City, which was Irvin Feld's business address, who also administered other notable music publishing firms like Desilu Music Corp. Calyork Music remained intact through BMI and continued to be administered by Feld. Hecht & Buzzell Music was however renamed, yet again, around 1965, this time to Colby Music, Inc., which made it easier to relate the company its existing British and European venture Colby Music, Ltd. Colby Music's address was listed care of Samuel Jesse Buzzell (Loring's father), 460 Park Avenue, New York. A deal was made with Richmond's Essex Music, Inc. to administer Colby Music, Inc. Many of the songs that had been previously recorded were re-issued on discs with updated publishing credits to Colby Music, which continues to administer the songs through ASCAP.

Published works
This list was compiled from the Catalog of Copyright Entries, Music from 1955–1960. It is believed to be incomplete.

 Composer legend: a = arrangement, l = lyrics, m = music, w = words

Partial list of releases
Though Hecht, Lancaster and Buzzell briefly operated the record labels Calyork Records and Maine Records, the majority of the recordings made from their published songs have been released on vinyl, cassette, CD and digitally through other record labels. This list is an attempt to document the company's efforts.

Legend: ≈ = Cromwell Music publishing, † = Hecht-Lancaster & Buzzell Music publishing, ¤ = Calyork Music publishing, ‡ = Hecht & Buzzell Music publishing

Singles

LPs

References

External links
Hecht-Lancaster & Buzzell Inc on Discogs
Hecht & Buzzell Inc on Discogs

1956 establishments in New York City
Companies based in New York City
Defunct companies based in New York City
Mass media companies established in 1956
Music organizations based in the United States
Music publishing companies of the United States
Norma Productions
Production music